Anjaneya is a 2003 Indian Tamil-language action film directed by N. Maharajan, featuring Ajith Kumar, Meera Jasmine in lead roles, alongside an ensemble cast. The film, produced by S. S. Chakravarthy, had its score and soundtrack composed by Mani Sharma. The film opened on 24 October 2003 alongside Vijay's Thirumalai and the film gained high negative reviews with critics. The film was later dubbed into Hindi under the same name in 2012.

Plot
ACP Paramaguru is an efficient police officer who fights with the scum of the society. He later masquerades as a thief to infiltrate into the underworld. The bad guys are surprised to find that Paramguru is the ACP and is out to get them, so they all gang up against him. In this process, a thrilling encounter takes place between the good and the evil. Paramaguru is helped in his fight against injustice by Divya, who falls in love with him.

Cast

Production
The leading female role was eventually handed to Meera Jasmine even though Reemma Sen was also approached earlier for the film. The film feature Ajith Kumar in his first role as a police officer, before further appearances in Aegan, Mankatha, Arrambam and Yennai Arindhaal. The film was shot within 47 days, with Ajith reportedly working extra time to complete scenes. Producers downplayed any publicity for the film, releasing the audio with little fanfare and not releasing a teaser trailer.

Soundtrack
The soundtrack features 5 songs composed by Mani Sharma and lyrics were written by Vairamuthu and Kabilan. The song "Paisa Gopuram" is based on "Kodithe Kottali" from Tagore.

Reception
Made on a high budget of 10 crore, Anjaneya received high negative 
reviews from the audience and critics, with the critic from The Hindu that “Ajith's acting was immatured” also claiming"the lack of consistency in the affects the film no end", criticizing Maharajan's direction.

References

External links
 

2003 films
Fictional portrayals of the Tamil Nadu Police
2000s Tamil-language films
2000s masala films
Films scored by Mani Sharma
Indian police films
Indian action drama films
2003 action drama films
Law enforcement in fiction